Nakithoun (English: "Renegades") is an Islamist organization led by Abu Rami that split from Hizb ut-Tahrir, another Islamist organization. It is particularly strong in support in Jordan.

References

External links
Official Site of The Hizb ut Tahrir 

Islamism